Shkodër County is a county in northwestern Albania, with the capital in Shkodër. The county spans  and had a total population of 197,177 people as of 2021. The county borders on the counties of Lezhë, Kukës and the country of Montenegro. The county consists of five municipalities: Fushë-Arrëz, Malësi e Madhe, Pukë, Shkodër and Vau i Dejës.

During the Bronze Age, the area was inhabited by various Illyrian tribes such as the Ardiaeis and Labeataes. Illyria was annexed by Rome in the second century BC, becoming an integral part of the Roman Empire and its successor the Byzantine Empire. Falling under Venetian and Ottoman dominion in the late Middle Ages, the modern nation state of Albania emerged in 1912 following its independence.

The climate of the county is profoundly affected by the Adriatic Sea in the west and the Albanian Alps in the north. It experiences mostly mediterranean climate, while the north enjoys continental climate. The summers are predominantly hot and dry, the winters relatively mild, and falls and springs mainly unstable, both in terms of precipitation and temperatures. Heavy rainfall is extremely common in the county and has caused many floodings of the rivers and lakes.

The county features notable diversity with the landscape ranging from the snow-capped Albanian Alps in the north to the warm regions of Shkodra Lake and Adriatic Sea in the south and southwest. Being a geological continuation of the Dinaric Alps, the Albanian Alps are the highest section and one of the most rugged mountains in Europe. While the Alps occupy the northern part of the territory, the population is concentrated mostly on the Mbishkodra plain, where the largest city is to be found, the cultural and economic centre of Shkodër. The mountainous areas of the county is sparsely populated, where the population density falls. The largest lake of Southern and Southeastern Europe, the Lake Shkodër sprawls in the east and is shared with Montenegro.

With more than 215,000 inhabitants in 2016, the county is the sixth most populous county in Albania, the second most populous county in the Northern Region. The county is ethnically a homogeneous county and mostly inhabited by Gheg Albanians. In addition, Egyptians, Montenegrins and Greeks also are present in the ethnic composition of the local population. The country has no official religion and freedom of religion is a right defined by the Constitution of Albania, and the most widely professed religion in the county is Catholic Christianity and Islam.

Geography 

Shkodër is one of 12 counties of Albania, located in the west of the Northern Region. It is limited to the counties of Kukës to the northeast and east, Lezhë to the southeast and south, the country of Montenegro in the north and the Adriatic Sea in the southwest.

The county has a wide variety of topographical sets and natural landscapes. The Albanian Alps, which extends in the north of the county toward Montenegro, is a primarily mountainous region with a high terrain. The alps delineated several sedimentary basins such as the Mbishkodra basin in the center.
 

Due to the considerable variation in altitude, it makes for a wide range of climate types. The Adriatic Sea in the west and Albanian Alps in the north have a great influence to the climate of the county. Most of the county has a usually rainy and hot mediterranean climate as defined by the Köppen climate classification.

Protected areas 

Phytogeographically, the county falls within the Dinaric Mountains mixed forests and Illyrian deciduous forests terrestrial ecoregions of the Palearctic Temperate broadleaf and mixed forest and Mediterranean forests, woodlands, and scrub. Inside the county, there are a national park, a nature park and a protected landscape, which include the Theth National Park, Nikaj-Mërtur Regional Nature Park and the Buna River-Velipoja Protected Landscape. The northern bound of the county forms a part of the European Green Belt, which serves as a retreat for endangered mammal and plant species.

Demography
 

The county of Shkodër is the 6th most populous county in the Republic of Albania. The Institute of Statistics (INSTAT) estimated the population at 197,177 in 2021. As of the 2011 census, in terms of ethnicity, the county was 91.65% Albanian, 0.32% Egyptian, 0.18% Romani, 0.13% Montenegrin and 0.02% Greek. By language, 99.77% people spoke Albanian as a first language. Other spoken languages were Italian (0.04%), Serbo-Croatian (0.03%), Turkish (0.02%) and Greek (0.01%). By religious affiliation, 44.84% were Muslim, 0.07% were Bektashi, 47.19% were Catholics, 0.38% were Orthodox, 0.09% were Evangelists, 0.02% were other Christians, 0.31% were believers without denomination, 0.14% were Atheists and 0.01% followed other religions. 4.94% did not wish to answer and 2.02% did not state.

Gallery

See also 

 Geography of Albania
 Politics of Albania
 Divisions of Albania

References 

 
Shkodër